Amblyscirtes linda, or Linda's roadside skipper, is a species of grass skipper in the family Hesperiidae. It was described by Hugh Avery Freeman in 1943 and is found in North America.

References

 Hodges, Ronald W., et al., eds. (1983). Check List of the Lepidoptera of America North of Mexico, xxiv + 284.
 Opler, Paul A. (1992). A Field Guide to Eastern Butterflies, xvii + 396.
 Pelham, Jonathan P. (2008). "A catalogue of the butterflies of the United States and Canada with a complete bibliography of the descriptive and systematic literature". Journal of Research on the Lepidoptera, vol. 40, xiv + 658.

Further reading

 Butterflies and Moths of North America
 Arnett, Ross H. (2000). American Insects: A Handbook of the Insects of America North of Mexico. CRC Press.

Hesperiinae
Butterflies described in 1943